Edward Island is an uninhabited island of the Greenland Sea, Greenland. The island is unglaciated.

Geography
Edward Island is a coastal island located east of Queen Louise Land, off Cape Stop, east of Borge Fjord and north of Godfred Hansen Island in the Dove Bay, northeastern Greenland.

See also
List of islands of Greenland

References

Uninhabited islands of Greenland